Hell is a French film, released in 2005 and directed by Danis Tanović. It is based on a script originally drafted by Krzysztof Kieślowski and Krzysztof Piesiewicz, which was meant to be the second film in a trilogy with the titles Heaven, Hell and Purgatory. The script was finished by Piesiewicz after Kieślowski died in 1996. The movie stars Emmanuelle Béart, Marie Gillain, and Carole Bouquet.

Plot
The film is set in Paris and is about three sisters: Celine, Anne and Sophie. It starts with a scene in which a woman and her young daughter (who we later find out is Celine) walk into an office and see two people: her father, and a young man who is naked.

After Sebastian has met Celine a few times much later in their adulthood, following a misunderstanding in which she strips for him as she believes him to be an admirer, he confides to her that he was the young man, and that her father's imprisonment for this crime was actually his fault. He said that he had fallen in love with her father and, finally being alone with him and not knowing what else to do, took off his clothes.

It is revealed that the girls' father tried to see his daughters on his release from prison when they were young. He broke into his ex-wife's apartment and locked her in the kitchen to try to see his daughters and attempts to see them, but they, having been told by their mother what their father has done, have locked themselves in their bedroom. The mother breaks out of the kitchen and he assaults her, leaving her with a brain injury and an inability to speak. He then jumps from the window, killing himself.

In the present day, Anne has an affair with a man who is both the father of her best friend and a Sorbonne professor, by whom she becomes pregnant (while the professor is still married). Sophie's marriage falls apart as her husband has an affair.

Celine contacts her sisters, whom she has not seen for some time even though all three live in Paris, and explains the truth of her father's innocence as revealed by Sebastian. They visit their mother in her beautiful aged care home, and explain that their father's conviction was a mistake, and she was wrong to vilify him. She replies by writing 'I have no regrets', implying an ulterior motive in denouncing her then-husband. The audience is left wondering if he cheated on her, long ago, and thus each of the four women share a tortured history of men in their lives.

Cast
Emmanuelle Béart – Sophie
Karin Viard – Céline
Marie Gillain – Anne
Guillaume Canet – Sébastien
Jacques Gamblin – Pierre
Jacques Perrin – Frédéric
Carole Bouquet – Marie, the mother
Miki Manojlović – Antoin, the father
Jean Rochefort – Louis
Maryam d'Abo – Julie
Gaëlle Bona – Joséphine
Françoise Bertin – The neighbor
Tiffany Tougard – young Céline
Marie Loboda – young Sophie
Emma Cuzon – young Anne
Julian Ciais – young Sébastien

Reception
The film received mixed reviews. Philip French panned it as "dull" and Scott Foundas, writing for Variety, called it a "cold, protracted work marked by solid, but passionless performances". Peter Bradshaw praised its vigor and its performances.

References

External links
 
 
 

French drama films
2005 films
Italian drama films
Films directed by Danis Tanović
Japanese drama films
Films with screenplays by Krzysztof Piesiewicz
Films with screenplays by Krzysztof Kieślowski
2000s Japanese films
2000s French films